HATS-3 is a F-type main-sequence star. Its surface temperature is 6351 K. HATS-3 is relatively depleted in its concentration of heavy elements, with a metallicity Fe/H index of −0.157, but is slightly younger than the Sun at an age of 3.2 billion years.

A multiplicity survey in 2016 detected a candidate stellar companion to HATS-3, 3.671 arc-seconds away.

Planetary system
In 2013, one planet, named HATS-3b, was discovered on a tight, nearly circular orbit. The planetary orbit of HATS-3b is likely aligned with the equatorial plane of the star, at a misalignment angle of 3°. Planetary equilibrium temperature is 1643 K.

References

Cetus (constellation)
Planetary transit variables
F-type main-sequence stars
Planetary systems with one confirmed planet
J20494978-2425436